Rayford is both a given name and surname.

People

Given name
Rayford Barnes (1920-2000), American film and TV character actor
Rayford Cooks (born 1962), American football player
Rayford B. High Jr., American bishop
Rayford Logan (1897-1982), African-American historian and Pan-African activist
Rayford Petty, American college football coach
Rayford Price (1937-2023), American politician
Rayford Jeffrey Ray, American bishop
Ray Robinson (Australian cricketer) (1914-1965), Australian cricketer
Trae Young (Rayford Trae Young, born 1998), American basketball player

Surname
Alma Rayford (1903-1987), American silent film actress
Caesar Rayford (born 1986), American football defensive lineman with the Utah Blaze of the AFL
Floyd Rayford (born 1957), African-American retired Major League Baseball player
Robert Rayford (1953-1969), American teenager and earliest confirmed HIV/AIDS case in North America
Sugaray Rayford (born 1969), American singer and songwriter

Fictional
Rayford Steele, the protagonist in the Left Behind series of novels
Rayford "Raymie" Steele, son of Rayford and Irene Steele
Re=L Rayford from the Japanese light novel and anime television series Akashic Records of Bastard Magic Instructor

See also
Raeford, North Carolina
Raiford, Florida
Florida State Prison, called "Raiford" because its postal address is Raiford, Florida
"Four Walls of Raiford", a song on Legend (Lynyrd Skynyrd album)
Dan R. McGehee (1883-1962), American representative 
Rayford Price (born 1937), American politician
Walter R. Tucker Jr. (1924-1990), American dentist and politician
Walter R. Tucker III (born 1957), American politician and son of Walter Jr.

Given names